Periorbital dermatitis  is a skin condition, a variant of perioral dermatitis, occurring on the lower eyelids and skin adjacent to the upper and lower eyelids.

See also 
 Granulomatous perioral dermatitis
 Perioral dermatitis

References 

Acneiform eruptions
Periorbital conditions